Tetrapleura  may refer to:

Tetrapleura (fly), a genus of flies in the family Ulidiidae
Tetrapleura (plant), a genus of plants in the family Fabaceae